Asada Tokunori (November 21, 1848 – March 30, 1933) was a Japanese politician from the Meiji era. He served as governor of Hiroshima Prefecture in 1897–1898 and 1898–1903, governor of Kanagawa Prefecture (1889–1891, 1898–1900), Nagano (1891–1896) and Niigata Prefecture (1896–1897). He also served as the director of the Public Communications Bureau in the Foreign Ministry under Foreign Minister Inoue Kaoru.

References 

Governors of Hiroshima
1853 births
1932 deaths
Japanese Home Ministry government officials
Governors of Kanagawa Prefecture
Governors of Nagano
Governors of Niigata Prefecture